C. W. "Skip" Smith (October 28, 1947 – November 4, 2017) was an American stock car racing driver and Pennsylvania state trooper who previously ran 7 NASCAR Xfinity Series races and 24 ARCA Racing Series races between 1994 and 2005.

Racing career
Smith drove in 24 ARCA Racing Series races from 1994 to 2004 in his self-owned #67 Chevrolet. Never running more than four races in one season, Smith finished as high as 66th in points (in 1996) and failed to qualify just once in his 22 attempts. He finished his ARCA career following 2004, having run on just three different tracks (Daytona, Talladega, and his native Pocono), posting six top-tens (with a best finish of 6th), and nine DNFs in 21 career races.

Smith took his ARCA team up to the NASCAR Busch Series beginning in 1999. Along with Daytona and Talladega (Pocono not being on the schedule), he would also attempt races at Rockingham and Michigan.  He would attempt 15 races between 1999 and 2005, making the field seven of those times. 

Acquiring sponsorship from Panasonic for the 2002 season, he is perhaps best known for his performance in that year's Aaron's 312 at Talladega. Making it through The Big One on lap 15 that took out 27 cars, Smith was running in the top 10 for most of the race until overheating issues ended his day on lap 75 of 117. Despite the DNF, Smith would still finish the race in 13th, his best finish in the series.

Smith would retire following the 2005 season, ending his career with two top-15 finishes and six DNFs.

Personal life
Smith was a graduate of Williamsport Area Community College and the Pennsylvania State Police Academy, serving as a Pennsylvania state trooper for 35 years. His son Jason Smith won the Pro Stock track championship at Selinsgrove Speedway in 2009.

Smith died of leukemia on November 4, 2017.

Motorsports career results

NASCAR
(key) (Bold – Pole position awarded by qualifying time. Italics – Pole position earned by points standings or practice time. * – Most laps led.)

Busch Series

ARCA Re/Max Series
(key) (Bold – Pole position awarded by qualifying time. Italics – Pole position earned by points standings or practice time. * – Most laps led.)

References

External links
 

1947 births
2017 deaths
Sportspeople from Williamsport, Pennsylvania
Racing drivers from Pennsylvania
NASCAR drivers
American state police officers
ARCA Menards Series drivers